Tadhg, commonly misspelled "Taig" or "Teague", is an Irish and Scottish Gaelic masculine name that was very common when the Goidelic languages predominated, to the extent that it is a synecdoche for Irish-speaking man. The name signifies "poet" or "philosopher". This was also the name of many Gaelic Irish kings from the 10th to the 16th centuries, particularly in Connacht and Munster. Tadhg is most common in south-west Ireland, particularly in County Cork and County Kerry.
The name has enjoyed a surge in popularity recently; in 2005 it was the 69th most common name for baby boys and in 2010 the 40th, according to the Central Statistics Office in Ireland.

Etymology 
The commonly accepted meaning of Tadhg is "poet" or "storyteller". The ultimate derivation is from the Celtic , who were poets in early Celtic society. In any case, the name is widely attested in Gaulish and early British names.

When the whole of Ireland was part of the United Kingdom, many Irish names and place-names were given English meanings. Due to similarity in sound, Tadhg is often listed as an Irish equivalent of the English-language names Thaddeus, Timothy (Tim) or sometimes Thomas, but these names are not actually related.

The name is also spelled "Taḋg" in Gaelic type with an overdot over the d to indicate it is lenited; the "dh" serves a similar purpose in the modern spelling. Tadhg has been anglicized as "Taihg", "Tighe" and "Teague". Alternative spellings are "Tadgh" and "Tadhgh".

Synecdoche
Tadhg is also a synecdoche and was once so common as an Irish name that it became synonymous with the typical Irishman in the same way that Paddy or Mick might be today.

The anglicisation Taig (and formerly Teague) has been used in English since the seventeenth century to refer to Irishmen. The Irish-language name is used defiantly in a Jacobite poem written in the 1690s:
{|
! Original
!rowspan=5|   
! Translation
|-
|"You Popish rogue", 
|"You Popish rogue" is not spoken
|-
| "Cromwellian dog" 
|but "Cromwellian dog" is our watchword,
|-
|
|"Who goes there" does not provoke fear,
|-
|
|"I am Tadhg" is the answer given
|}

Taig in the Troubles in Northern Ireland was used as an abusive and pejorative term by Protestant loyalists to refer to Catholic nationalists.

People with the name

Traditional 
 Tadg mac Nuadat, a Druid in the Fenian Cycle, grandfather of Fionn mac Cumhail

Gaelic nobility 
 Tadg mac Conchobair (died 900), king of Connacht
 Tadg mac Cathail (died 956), king of Connacht
 Tadg mac Conchobair (died 962), king of Ailech
 Tadhg mac Muircheartach (died 971), king of Uí Díarmata
 Tadhg Mór Ua Cellaigh (died 1014), king of Uí Maine
 Tadc mac Briain (died 1023), contender for king of Munster
 Tadg in Eich Gil (died 1030), king of Connacht
 Tadhg mac Muirchertach (fl. 11th century), king of Moylurg
 Tadg mac Ruaidrí Ua Conchobair (died 1097), king of Connacht
 Tadhg mac Muireadach Mac Cárthaigh (died 1123), king of Desmond
 Tadhg Mor mac Maelruanaidh (died 1124), king of Moylurg
 Tadhg Ua Cellaigh (abducted 1145), king of Uí Maine
 Teige Ua Con Ceannainn (fl. 1152), king of Uí Díarmata
 Tadg Gláe macDiarmata Ó Briain (died 1154), claimed king of Desmond
 Tadhg Cael Uisce Ó Briain (died 1269), tanist of Thomond
 Tadhg mac Diarmata (died 1281), king of Moylurg
 Tadhg Ó Cellaigh (died 1316), king of Uí Maine
 Tadgh Óg Ó Cellaigh (died 1340), king of Uí Maine
 Tadgh na gcoar Ó Ruairc (died 1376), king of West Breifne
 Tadgh Ruadh Ó Cellaigh (died 1410), king of Uí Maine
 Tadhg na Mainistreach Mac Carthaigh Mór (died 1428), king of Desmond
 Tadhg Riabhach Ó Dubhda (died 1432), king of Ui Fiachrach Muaidhe
 Tadhg mac Tigernán Mór Ó Ruairc (died 1435), king of West Breifne
 Tadhg an Glemore Ó Briain (died 1438), king of Thomond
 Tadhg an Chomhaid Ó Briain (died 1466), king of Thomond
 Tadhg mac Diarmaid Ó Máille (died 1467), king of Umaill
 Tadhg Caech Ó Cellaigh (abdicated 1476), king of Uí Maine
 Tadhg mac Diarmata (died 1499), king of Moylurg
 Tadgh Liath Mac Carthaigh Mór (died 1503), king of Desmond
 Tadgh na Leamhna Mac Cárthaigh (died 1514), claimed king of Desmond
 Tadhg Ruadh mac Toirrdelbach (died 1553), king of Mide
 Tadhg mac Brian Ballach Ó Ruairc (died 1560), king of West Breifne
 Tadhg mac Diarmata (died 1585), king of Moylurg
 Tadhg mac Briain na Murtha Ó Ruairc (died 1605), king of West Breifne

Recent 
 Tadhg Cooke, Irish contemporary musician
Tadhg Slater, Abstract expressionist, MOMA, Boston and NYC. 
 Tadhg Ó Donnchadha (1874–1949), activist for the Gaelic League
 Tadhg Furlong (born 1992), Irish rugby player
 Tadhg Kennelly (born 1981), Gaelic and Australian Rules footballer
 Tadhg Dall Ó hÚigínn (1550–1591), Irish poet murdered allegedly for writing a satirical poem which insulted a rival aristocratic family
 Tadhg Purcell (born 1985), Irish soccer player
 George MacDonald Fraser's 1977 novel Flashman's Lady features the comic character Daedalus Tighe, and John B. Keane's 1965 play The Field, has a character named Tadhg McCabe.

See also 
 List of Irish-language given names

References

External links 

Irish-language masculine given names